Kira Weidle (born 24 February 1996) is a German World Cup alpine ski racer, specializing in the speed events of Downhill   World Cup debut in January 2016 and attained her first podium  Weidle won the silver medal in the downhill at the 2021 World Championships in Cortina d'Ampezzo.

World Cup results

Season standings

Race podiums

6 podiums – (6 DH); 27 top tens

World Championship results

Olympic results

References

External links

1996 births
Living people
German female alpine skiers
Alpine skiers at the 2018 Winter Olympics
Alpine skiers at the 2022 Winter Olympics
Olympic alpine skiers of Germany
Sportspeople from Stuttgart
21st-century German women